Lola Township is a township in Cherokee County, Kansas, USA.  As of the 2000 census, its population was 382.

Geography
According to the USGS, it contains four cemeteries: Cherokee, Dove, Garrison and Spickelmire.

The streams of Deer Creek, Denny Branch, Fly Creek, Fourmile Creek, Lightning Creek and Wolf Creek run through this township.

Transportation
Lola Township contains one airport or landing strip, Oswego Municipal Airport.

References
 USGS Geographic Names Information System (GNIS)

External links
 City-Data.com

Townships in Cherokee County, Kansas
Townships in Kansas